Death Row: The Singles Collection is a compilation album released in 2007 by CEO of Death Row Recordings, Suge Knight, it contains hard to find remixes and b sides by artists such as Snoop Dogg, Tha Dogg Pound, 2Pac, Dr. Dre plus more. This has been removed from Apple Music

Track listing

Disc #1
Nuthin' But A "G" Thang (Freestyle Remix) - Snoop Dogg
Nuthin' But A "G" Thang (Club Mix) - Dr. Dre & Snoop Dogg
Fuck Wit Dre Day (and Everybody's Celebratin') (Extended Mix) - Dr. Dre & Snoop Dogg
Puffin' on Blunts & Drankin' Tanqueray (Extended Mix) - Dr. Dre Feat. Tha Dogg Pound & Lady of Rage
187 um (Deep Cover Remix) - Dr. Dre & Snoop Dogg
Let Me Ride (Extended Club Mix) - Dr. Dre Feat. Snoop Dogg, George Clinton & Daz
Who Am I (What's My Name) (Explicit Club Mix) - Snoop Dogg
Gin and Juice (Laid Back Remix) - Snoop Dogg
Afro Puffs (Extended Remix) - Lady of Rage Feat. Snoop Dogg & Dr. Dre
 Afro Puffs (G-Funk Remix) - Lady of Rage
 Gin & Juice (Remix) - Snoop Dogg [Best Buy Exclusive Track]
 Who Am I [What's My Name] (Remix) - Snoop Dogg [Best Buy Exclusive Track]

Disc #2
Regulate (Jammin' Remix) - Warren G Feat. Nate Dogg
Regulate (G-Funk Remix) - Warren G Feat. Nate Dogg
My Moni Rite - Lord G
U Better Recognize (Extended Remix) - Sam Sneed Feat. Dr. Dre
Slip N Slide (Remix) - Danny Boy Feat. Tha Dogg Pound
Snoop's Upside Ya Head (Remix) - Snoop Dogg Feat. Nate Dogg
Doggfather (Timbaland Remix) - Snoop Dogg
I Ain't Mad at Cha (Radio Version) - 2Pac Feat. Danny Boy
California Love (Single Version) - 2Pac Feat. Dr. Dre & Roger Troutman
To Live and Die In L.A. (Radio Version) - 2Pac
Hit Em Up - 2Pac
It Might Sound Crazy (Remix) - Daz Dillinger Feat. Too Short
Dre Day (Remix) - Jewell
Let Me Ride (Remix) - Dr. Dre [Best Buy Exclusive Track]
Lil' Ghetto Boy (Remix) - Dr. Dre [Best Buy Exclusive Track]

Record label compilation albums
Hip hop compilation albums
2007 compilation albums
Death Row Records compilation albums
Albums produced by Dr. Dre
Albums produced by Johnny "J"
Albums produced by Timbaland
Albums produced by Warren G
Gangsta rap compilation albums
G-funk compilation albums